Nicola Kollmann (born 23 November 1994) is a Liechtenstein footballer who plays as a midfielder for FC Ruggell and the Liechtenstein national team.

Career
Kollmann made his international debut for Liechtenstein on 7 October 2020 in a friendly match against Luxembourg, which finished as a 2–1 away win.

Career statistics

International

References

External links
 
 Nicola Kollmann at LFV.li

1994 births
Living people
People from Vaduz
Liechtenstein footballers
Liechtenstein youth international footballers
Liechtenstein under-21 international footballers
Liechtenstein international footballers
Association football midfielders
FC Ruggell players
FC Schaan players